The 2007–08 Premijer Liga season, the eighth since its establishment and the sixth as a unified country-wide league, began on 4 August 2007. FK Sarajevo are the defending Premijer Liga champions, having won their first Premijer Liga title and fourth league championship overall the previous season.

The 2006–07 season saw Borac and Radnik relegated to the Prva Liga RS. They were replaced by Laktaši and Travnik from the Prva Liga RS and FBiH respectively.

Clubs and stadiums

Premijer Liga All-Star Team (1st Half Season) 
Coaches of each team in the league decided to vote for players who have impressed the most in the first half of the season. The only twist is that the coaches couldn't vote a player from their own team. Coaches that participated in the votes are: Slaviša Bižičić (FK Modriča), Husref Musemić (FK Sarajevo), Enver Hadžiabdić (FK Željezničar), Pavle Skočibušić (NK Žepče), Dušan Jevrić (Slavija Sarajevo), Mirza Golubica (NK Travnik), Sakib Malkočević (Sloboda Tuzla), Anel Karabeg (FK Velež Mostar), Vlado Jagodić (FK Laktaši), Mario Ćutuk (NK Široki Brijeg), Ivo Ištuk (NK Čelik Zenica), Ahmet Kečalović (NK Jedinstvo Bihać), Dragan Jović (HŠK Zrinjski Mostar), Srđan Bajić (FK Leotar Trebinje), Vinko Jurišić (NK Posušje) and Bakir Beširević (HNK Orašje).

      (NK Čelik Zenica)
     (NK Široki Brijeg)
 (FK Sarajevo)
     (NK Široki Brijeg)
(FK Sarajevo)
     (FK Željezničar)
    (FK Sarajevo)
     (FK Modriča)
   (HŠK Zrinjski Mostar)
      (FK Željezničar)
    (FK Modriča)

Other players that have been voted:

Vasilj, Tripic, Lukačević, Matko, Šabić, S. Nikolić, Hasanović, Mikelini, Mulalić, Vugdalić, Rajović, Stojanović, Marković, Bajić, Karadža, Stjepanović, Krstanović, Režić, Rogulj, Ronielle, Admir Raščić, Celson, Landeka, Kordić 1, A. Joldić, Mulina, Pejić, Ančić, Barišić, Bajić

League table

Results

Top goalscorers

External links
 BiH soccer 
 Football Association of Bosnia-Herzegovina official site 
 UEFA coverage 

Premier League of Bosnia and Herzegovina seasons
1
Bosnia